In number theory, a norm group is a group of the form  where  is a finite abelian extension of nonarchimedean local fields.

See also 
Takagi existence theorem

References 
J.S. Milne, Class field theory. Version 4.01.

Algebraic number theory